Søren Robin Oxholm Larsen (born 2 October 1949) is a Danish former footballer who played as a defender. He made four appearances for the Denmark national team from 1973 to 1975.

References

External links
 
 

1949 births
Living people
Danish men's footballers
Association football defenders
Denmark international footballers
Denmark youth international footballers
Denmark under-21 international footballers
Nykøbing FC players